= Sputnik Chinovnika =

Ukrainian magazine

Sputnik Chinovnika (Russian Cyrillic: Спутник чиновника) was a magazine issued in Kyiv between 1911 and 1914. According to its program, the whole journal was devoted to showing the financial and social status of office workers in the Russian Empire.
